Tuero can refer to the following people:

 Esteban Tuero (born 1978), Argentine racing driver
 Indalecio Prieto Tuero (1883–1962), Spanish politician and one of the leading figures of the Spanish Socialist Workers' Party (PSOE)
 Jack Tuero (1926–2004), tennis player
 Linda Tuero (born 1950), American amateur and professional tennis player
 Oscar Tuero (1898–1960), former professional baseball player